Hans Høllsberg (born 3 January 2002) is a Danish professional footballer who plays as a midfielder for Danish 2nd Division club Esbjerg fB, on loan from Vejle Boldklub.

Career

Vejle
Høllsberg started his career at Juelsminde IF, before later moving to Vejle Boldklub at the age of 13. On 25 September 2020 Vejle confirmed, that Høllsberg had signed a new contract, running from the 1 January 2021 and one-and-a-half-years onwards.

After good performances in the 2021–22 pre-season with Vejle's first team, Høllsberg was rewarded with a new contract, this time until June 2024. Høllsberg was also permanently promoted to the first team squad. Shortly after, on 18 July 2021, Høllsberg got his official debut for Vejle in a Danish Superliga game against Randers FC. On 31 August 2022 it was confirmed, that Høllsberg had joined newly relegated Danish 2nd Division side Esbjerg fB on a season-long loan deal.

References

External links

2002 births
Living people
Danish men's footballers
Association football midfielders
Danish Superliga players
Vejle Boldklub players
Esbjerg fB players
People from Hedensted Municipality
Sportspeople from the Central Denmark Region